Anatoly Mikhaylovich Stessel (–) was a Russian baron of German descent, military leader, and general.

Biography 
Anatoly Stessel, born in 1848 as the son of Lieutenant General Baron Vinogradov Stessel, graduated from the Pavel Military School in 1866. Stessel participated in the Russo-Turkish War (1877–1878). He subsequently commanded the 16th Ladoga Infantry Regiment in 1897, and then from 1897 to 1899 the 44th Kamchatka Infantry Regiment. He was appointed to head the 3rd East Siberian Brigade (1899–1903), and distinguished himself for his role in the suppression of the Boxer Movement of 1899–1901 in Qing China, being wounded in combat during the Battle of Tientsin in July 1900. He was subsequently awarded the Order of St. George (4th degree).

From 12 August 1903 Stessel commanded the Russian garrison of Port Arthur in Manchuria  – a total of over 50,000 men. Imperial Russia had occupied Port Arthur from 1897, and had heavily enhanced and modernized its defenses in the intervening years – its position was considered one of the most heavily fortified in the world.

The Russo-Japanese War of 1904-1905 started in February 1904; Stessel was promoted to governor of the Kwantung Military District in March 1904, and Lieutenant General Konstantin Smirnov was appointed as his successor at Port Arthur. However, Stessel chose to interpret the orders to mean that Smirnov was his subordinate, and remained at Port Arthur, countermanding Smirnov's orders and denying his requests for supplies and reinforcements, and sending misleading telegrams to the Tsar blaming Smirnov for any setbacks. He also ignored orders from General Aleksei Kuropatkin (the commander-in-chief of the Russian land forces in Manchuria) to leave Port Arthur on a destroyer on 3 July 1904.  Stessel's command of the Port Arthur defenses was ineffective throughout the Siege of Port Arthur (July 1904 to January 1905). In August 1904, after the Japanese victory at the Battle of Nanshan in May 1904, Stessel refused Japanese offers to evacuate the women and non-combatants from Port Arthur, and by autumn food was in short supply. 

Following the death of General Roman Kondratenko on 15 December 1904 at Fort Chikuan, Stessel appointed the incompetent Alexander Fok in his place. On 18 December 1904 the Japanese exploded an 1800-kilogram mine under Fort Chikuan (東鶏冠山北堡塁 in Japanese), which fell that night. On 28 December 1904 mines under Fort Erhlung were detonated, destroying that fort as well.

On 31 December 1904 a series of mines were exploded under Fort Sungshu, Port Arthur's sole surviving major fortress, which surrendered that day. On 1 January 1905 Wantai finally fell to the Japanese. On the same day, Stessel and Fok sent a message to a surprised Japanese General Nogi Maresuke, offering to surrender. None of the other senior Russian staff had been consulted, and many were outraged.

General Nogi accepted the offer of surrender, and the two sides signed a ceasefire agreement on 2 January 1905 at Shuishiying. After occupying the city, the Japanese were surprised to find large stores of food and ammunition; the Japanese, along with some of the Russian officials, believed Stessel had surrendered prematurely. While the Japanese interned the surviving men and officers of the Russian garrison at Port Arthur as prisoners-of-war, they allowed Stessel to return to St. Petersburg in comfortable quarters on a British passenger-liner. However, Stessel was discharged from the Imperial Russian Army on 30 September 1906 and was soon arrested (with several other members of the Russian military) and faced court-martial charges for cowardice and for surrendering Port Arthur to the Japanese. After a year of deliberations, he was sentenced to death on 7 February 1908. This sentence was later commuted to ten years imprisonment.

On 6 May 1909 Emperor Nicholas II pardoned Stessel,
who continued his military service through the start of World War I. He died in 1915 in Khmilnyk (in present-day Vinnytsia Oblast, Ukraine).

Awards
 Order of St. George, 4th class
 Order of St. George, 3rd class
 Order of St. Anne 3rd degree, 2nd degree, 1st degree
 Order of St Vladimir 4th degree, 3rd degree.
 Order of St. Stanislaus  1st degree, 2nd degree, 3rd degree
 Order of the Rising Sun, 2nd degree, (Japan)
 Order of the Red Eagle, (Prussia)
 Pour le Mérite, (Prussia)
Order of Bravery (Bulgaria)

References
Connaughton, R.M (1988). The War of the Rising Sun and the Tumbling Bear—A Military History of the Russo-Japanese War 1904–5, London, .

Jukes, Geoffry. The Russo-Japanese War 1904–1905.  Osprey Essential Histories. (2002).  .
Warner, Denis & Peggy. The Tide at Sunrise, A History of the Russo-Japanese War 1904–1905. (1975).  .
Nozhin, Evgenii Konstantinovich; Lindsay, Alexander Bertram; Swinton, Ernest Dunlop. The Truth About Port Arthur. London. John Murray, Albemarle Street, W. (1908)

Notes

1848 births
1915 deaths
Imperial Russian Army generals
Russian military personnel of the Russo-Turkish War (1877–1878)
Russian military personnel of the Boxer Rebellion
Russian military personnel of the Russo-Japanese War
Recipients of the Order of St. George of the Third Degree
Russian people of German descent